The Stretto di Messina S.p.A. company was established in 1981 in implementation of law no. 1158/1971 of the Italian government to design, build and manage the Strait of Messina Bridge.

History
The Stretto di Messina S.p.A. it was put into liquidation by the Monti Cabinet on 15 April 2013.

See also
 Strait of Messina Bridge
 ANAS
 Salini Impregilo

References

External links
 

Construction and civil engineering companies of Italy
Companies based in Rome
Construction and civil engineering companies established in 1981
Strait of Messina Bridge
Italian companies established in 1981